Mesaptilotus is a genus of flies belonging to the family Lesser Dung flies.

Species
M. ancoralis Richards, 1963
M. belemnus Richards, 1963
M. bihamatus Richards, 1963
M. disjunctus Richards, 1965
M. flavitarsis Richards, 1963
M. hamatus Richards, 1963
M. laminatus Richards, 1963
M. minimus Richards, 1963
M. ochritarsis Richards, 1963
M. pollinosus Richards, 1951
M. setitibia Richards, 1963
M. tibiellus Richards, 1963
M. tumidus Richards, 1963
M. vittifrons Richards, 1955

References

Sphaeroceridae
Diptera of Africa
Brachycera genera